Timboektoe is a 2007 Dutch film based on a series of novels by Carry Slee. The film received the Golden Film after it had sold 100,000 cinema tickets.

Cast
 Bo Maerten - Isa
 Mees Peijnenburg - Tim Ferket
 Willem Voogd - Henk
 Isabelle Houdtzagers - Nona
 Anna Raadsveld - Annabel
 Reinout Scholten van Aschat - Stef
 Geza Weisz - Romeo
 Jeronimo van Ballegoijen - Brian
 Cosmo de Vos - Edgar
 Daniel Cornelissen - Justin
 Anne Wallis de Vries - Anouk
 Liessanne Schenkkan - Valerie
 Ruben Lürsen - Ad
 Mouna Goeman Borgesius - Hanna
 Marcel Hensema - Jean
 Khaldoun Elmecky - father Nona
 Esmée de la Bretonière - mother Nona
 Marline Williams - Lucy
 Mike Reus - Arthur
 Margo Dames - Agnes
 Katja Herbers - Arlette

External links
  
 

Dutch drama films
2007 films
2000s Dutch-language films